Sotos Point is a glaciated point projecting 180 m into the southeast part of Discovery Bay, Greenwich Island in the South Shetland Islands, Antarctica and forming the east side of the entrance to Montecinos Cove.

Sotos Point was named by the 1949-50 Chilean Antarctic Expedition after several members of the expedition with the surname Soto, while Montecinos Cove was named by the 1947 Chilean Antarctic Expedition after a member of the expedition.

Location

Maps
 L.L. Ivanov et al. Antarctica: Livingston Island and Greenwich Island, South Shetland Islands. Scale 1:100000 topographic map. Sofia: Antarctic Place-names Commission of Bulgaria, 2005.
 L.L. Ivanov. Antarctica: Livingston Island and Greenwich, Robert, Snow and Smith Islands. Scale 1:120000 topographic map.  Troyan: Manfred Wörner Foundation, 2009.

References
 SCAR Composite Antarctic Gazetteer.

Headlands of Greenwich Island